A Storm in Heaven is the debut studio album by the English rock band the Verve, at the time known just as Verve, released on 21 June 1993 on the Hut label. It charted at number twenty-seven in the UK. In 2013, NME ranked it at number 473 in its list of the 500 Greatest Albums of All Time.

Recording
A Storm in Heaven was recorded at Sawmills Studios in Cornwall over seven weeks between December 1992 and January 1993, with the producer John Leckie. The title is taken from Jay Stevens' book Storming Heaven, which detailed the effects of LSD on the United States during the 1960s counterculture movement. Leckie said the Verve were "one of the only bands that I’ve ever begged to work with... I just couldn’t believe what I was witnessing."

Of the ten songs that comprise the album, only three had been played live before recording – "Slide Away", "Already There" and "The Sun, the Sea". The remaining seven songs emanated from studio jam sessions. "[The album] was pretty much improvised," bass player Simon Jones recalled, stating that the band took a "bold" decision not to include their earlier singles on the record. According to Leckie, the band's compositional practices would regularly see them working until "four a.m. every night ... they were quite a nocturnal band ... they didn't get much sleep. They smoked a lot of dope." The band's guitarist, Nick McCabe, favoured a sound that "was about the tape echo and the reverb" in contrast to the prevailing orthodoxy of studio recording at the time, which he bemoaned as being "still stuck in the aesthetics of 80s recording techniques." According to his bandmate Jones, McCabe "didn’t treat the guitar like a guitar... He didn’t want to be a guitar hero. He wasn’t into Jimmy Page... It was all about texture."

The band incorporated a range of diverse influences while composing the music, ranging from Cocteau Twins and Can to free jazz. Penultimate track "Butterfly" was reportedly recorded at three a.m. while playing along with a Steely Dan sample. Drummer Peter Salisbury's percussion drew inspiration from Dr. John's Gris-Gris album, while the brass section from the Kick Horns on "The Sun, the Sea" and "Butterfly" was influenced by Fun House. "The band that Virgin signed, we ditched early on", McCabe said, "... early demos were like Rolling Stones power-pop tunes. They bore no relation to what ended up on A Storm in Heaven." Two versions of "Virtual World" were recorded, one featuring Yvette Lacey on flute (who had previously contributed to "Gravity Grave") and the other with slide guitar from McCabe. "Already There" is notable for being the only song by the Verve on which Richard Ashcroft and McCabe collaborated on the lyrics. While recording, Ashcroft would often improvise lyrics on the spot – the vocal take for "Blue" was only completed at six a.m. on the day that the band's record label were scheduled to receive the album's master tapes.

Album sleeve and artwork
As with all of the band's releases, A Storm in Heaven features artwork shot by Michael Spencer Jones and designed by Brian Cannon.  According to Cannon, the sleeve was done "in the days when we had loads of time to do the job. In the end, this image of a journey of life almost seemed to create itself. It's four scenes - birth, youth, middle age and old age. The front cover is Thor's Cave near Leek in northern Staffordshire, the burning car scene is in Billinge, the cellar is in Upholland and the old man in Ashcroft's clothes is Birkdale cemetery. The 'youth' part is the car on fire, and the band just playing chess to give off a 'we-don't-give-a-shit' vibe."

Reception

A Storm in Heaven was met with mixed reviews upon its release in 1993. Writing in Select, Andrew Collins said, "It's self-consciously rockier and more macho... the guitar often an aggressor and the voice a self-styled exotic mystery. On occasion, it actually sounds like The House of Love on valium." Lorraine Ali of the Los Angeles Times said, "this debut album makes its mark regardless. Singer Richard Ashcroft's whimsical, occasionally soul-wrenching vocals breeze in and out of delicate guitar interludes and hallucinatory washes of tumbling melody. Verve's "Storm" is a warm, inviting chill-out." Q was less enthusiastic, awarding the album two out of five upon release. Vox magazine awarded the album six out of ten, noting that "song structure and silly things like choruses are subservient to atmosphere and vibes."

Legacy
The album has gone on to accumulate further praise in the years since its release and has been described by one publication as The Verve's "masterpiece" and a landmark in psychedelic rock. Rudi Abdallah, writing for Drowned in Sound, declared that the "sounds explored on [A Storm in Heaven] are The Verve’s true form, the intuitive sound with which they should be identified." Nick Southall's 2003 retrospective for Stylus Magazine described the album's genesis as a result of the band going "into the studio with half a dozen riffs, half a dozen half-baked lyrics and a thousand ideas of ways to reach the sky. Leckie managed to seize the controls and apply the necessary degree of restraint and maturity, guiding the band back down to earth when they threatened to fly too close to the sun". In September 2016, Ian King, writing for PopMatters, awarded the album nine out of ten and remarked, "The greatest depth on A Storm in Heaven comes from the vaporous dreams that poured out of McCabe's guitar, traced patiently by Simon Jones' bass playing and Peter Salisbury's drumming. Though the Verve were able to compress their sound into radio-shaped singles "Slide Away" and "Blue", the most compelling compositions -- "Already There", "Beautiful Mind", "Virtual World"—are those that are allowed to naturally ebb and flow in a zone somewhere between pop editing and the looser jamming of the material that turned up on their singles and EPs".

Reflecting on the album's legacy, McCabe said "I think something of us as a band got lost after [A Storm in Heaven] ... For the next ten years after that, that sensation was missing from the music for me. That was the last time we made that kind of landscape for the imagination to run about in." John Leckie admitted having mixed feelings about the record; "We were searching for things and waiting for things, and waiting for it to rain down on us... We came close but neither they nor I thought they managed it. It lacked the overwhelming effect of the Verve experience, maybe as there was no audience to feed off."

The album would mark the band's last official release under the Verve moniker before changing their name to "The Verve" for legal reasons, so as not to clash with the record label Verve Records. In 2013, NME ranked it at number 473 in its list of the 500 Greatest Albums of All Time.

Track listing

Personnel
The Verve
 Richard Ashcroft – vocals, acoustic guitar on "See You in the Next One (Have a Good Time)", percussion on "Already There", "Beautiful Mind", "The Sun, The Sea", "Virtual World" and "Blue"
 Nick McCabe – guitars, piano on "Beautiful Mind" and "See You in the Next One (Have a Good Time)", accordion on "See You in the Next One (Have a Good Time)", keyboard on "Make It 'til Monday"
 Peter Salisbury – drums, percussion on "Star Sail" and "Virtual World"
 Simon Jones – bass, backing vocals on "Star Sail"
Additional musicians
 Simon Clarke – solo flute on "Virtual World", horn arrangements
 Kick Horns – trumpets, saxophones on "Already There", "The Sun, The Sea" and "Butterfly"
 Yvette Lacey – chorus flute on "Virtual World"
 Roddy Lorimer – horn arrangements
Technical personnel
 John Leckie – production, mixing
 John Cornfield – engineering, programming
 Sleeve concept, design and art direction by Brian Cannon for microdot
 Photography by Michael Spencer Jones

References

External links

 A Storm in Heaven at YouTube (streamed copy where licensed)
 Unofficial Verve site named after this album
 Ranked # 2 on list of Top 25 Britpop Albums at IGN

The Verve albums
1993 debut albums
Albums produced by John Leckie
Hut Records albums
Virgin Records albums
Shoegaze albums by English artists
Space rock albums